The Ether Monument, also known as The Good Samaritan, is a statue and fountain near the northwest corner of Boston's Public Garden, near the intersection of Arlington Street and Marlborough Street.

It commemorates the use of ether in anesthesia. Its design has been attributed to the Boston architect William Robert Ware and to the sculptor John Quincy Adams Ward.

Description

The statue depicts a medical doctor in medieval Moorish-Spanish robe and turban—representing a Good Samaritan—who holds the drooping body of an almost naked man on his left knee. The doctor holds in his left hand a cloth, suggesting the use of ether that would be developed in centuries to come.

The anachronistic use of a Moorish doctor was probably intentional and served to avoid choosing sides in a debate that was raging at the time over who should receive credit for the first use of ether as an anesthetic. A handful of individuals had claimed credit for the discovery of anesthesia, most notably William T. G. Morton and Crawford Long.

Inscriptions

At the base of the statue are inscriptions explaining the significance of the discovery of the use of ether as an anesthetic. There are four inscriptions, which include biblical quotations from Isaiah 28:29 and Revelation 21:4:

History

Massachusetts General Hospital, where this procedure took place, is located about a 15-minute walk from the site of the monument. The operating theater at MGH where the experiment took place was renamed the Ether Dome. It is now a National Historic Landmark. Several books have been written about this specific event.

The monument was erected in 1868. It was restored and rededicated in 2006.

Upkeep
As an outdoor monument in an area with a harsh climate, the structure has needed regular upkeep and repair. One source of revenue for upkeep of the monument has been income from R. A. Ortega's Written in Granite: An Illustrated History of the Ether Monument, which is available only by making a donation of at least $100 through the Friends of the Public Garden which goes to a fund devoted to preserving the monument for the future.

References

1860s establishments in Massachusetts
1867 establishments in Massachusetts
1867 sculptures
Boston Public Garden
Fountains in Massachusetts
Landmarks in Back Bay, Boston
Monuments and memorials in Boston
Outdoor sculptures in Boston
Stone sculptures in Massachusetts